Stenoma horocyma is a moth of the family Depressariidae. It is found in Amazonas, Brazil.

The wingspan is about 10 mm. The forewings are glossy dark indigo-blue grey with the costal edge white. There are white marks on the costa before and beyond the middle. The second discal stigma is white and there is a waved white line just within the margin around the posterior part of the costa and termen. The hindwings are grey.

References

Moths described in 1925
Taxa named by Edward Meyrick
Stenoma